Mynchakovo is a rural locality (a village) in Kubenskoye Rural Settlement, Vologodsky District, Vologda Oblast, Russia. The population was 366 as of 2002.

Geography 
Mynchakovo is located 65 km northwest of Vologda (the district's administrative centre) by road. Golovkovo is the nearest village.

References 

Rural localities in Vologodsky District